Ridin' the Outlaw Trail is a 1951 American Western film directed by Fred F. Sears and starring Charles Starrett, Sunny Vickers and Edgar Dearing. The film's sets were designed by the art director Charles Clague. Shot at the Iverson Ranch, it is part of the Durango Kid series of films.

Cast
 Charles Starrett as Steve Forsythe / The Durango Kid 
 Sunny Vickers as Betsy Willard 
 Edgar Dearing as Pop Willard 
 Jim Bannon as Ace Donley 
 Peter M. Thompson as Sheriff Tom Chapman 
 Pee Wee King as Pee Wee King - Golden West Cowboys Band Leader
 Golden West Cowboys as Cowboy Band 
 Smiley Burnette as Smiley Burnette 
 Ethan Laidlaw as Henchman

References

Bibliography
 Martin, Len D. Columbia Checklist: The Feature Films, Serials, Cartoons, and Short Subjects of Columbia Pictures Corporation, 1922-1988. McFarland, 1991.

External links
 

1951 films
1951 Western (genre) films
American Western (genre) films
Films directed by Fred F. Sears
Columbia Pictures films
American black-and-white films
1950s English-language films
1950s American films